Charles Mantoux (May 14, 1877, Paris – 1947) was a French physician and the developer of the eponymous serological test for tuberculosis.

He graduated from the University of Paris, where he studied under Broca. For health reasons, he relocated to Cannes but continued to work in Paris during the long vacation periods granted to patients in sanatoriums.

In 1908, he presented his first study of intradermal injections to the French Academy of Sciences and published this work in 1910. In the following years, the intradermal test replaced the subcutaneous test (Pirquet test). Mantoux completed this research and made other contributions to public health and radiology without any affiliation with major universities and institutions.

References

B.G. Firkin & J.A.Whitworth (1987). Dictionary of Medical Eponyms. Parthenon Publishing. 
La syphilis Nerveuse Latente et les Stigmates Nerveux de la Syphilis. Paris, 1904.

External links
 Charles Mantoux. WhoNamedIt.

1877 births
1947 deaths
French immunologists
Serologists